Club Sportiv Brazi, commonly known as CS Brazi, or simply as Brazi, is a Romanian amateur football club based in Brazi, Prahova County. The club was established in 1968, under the name of Chimia Brazi by the Brazi oil refinery. In 2002 the club was re-founded as CS Brazi (a multi-sport club). The football section is currently playing in the Liga VI (6th tier).

History
Founded in 1968 as Chimia Brazi, the club promoted for the first time in Divizia C at the end of the 1971–72 season, Chimiștii won Prahova County Championship and qualified for the Divizia C promotion play-off, where they faced the champion of București Municipal Championship, Uremoas București, and they won without major difficulties, (4–0 at Brazi and 1–1 at București).

Honours
Liga III
Winners (2): 1977–78, 2005–06
Runners-up (4): 1980–81, 1983–84, 2004–05, 2010–11
Liga IV – Prahova County
Winners (2): 1971–72, 1997–98

Notable managers
Octavian Grigore
Valeriu Răchită
Valentin Negoiță
Mihai Mocanu

Notable players
Valentin Lazăr
 Alin Stoica

References

External links
 
 

Association football clubs established in 1968
Football clubs in Prahova County
Liga II clubs
Liga III clubs
Liga IV clubs
1968 establishments in Romania